Mayor PNP Nancy Flores Paucar Airport  is an airport serving the municipality of Mazamari in Junin Region, Peru. The airport was formerly named Manuel Prado Ugarteche Airport.

Airlines and destinations

See also

Transport in Peru
List of airports in Peru

References

External links
OpenStreetMap - Mazamari

Mazamari municipality Spanish
Aeropuerto de Mazamari Spanish

Airports in Peru